University of Hawaii  Kapiolani Community College, formerly Kapiolani Technical School, is a public community college in Honolulu, Hawaii.  It is part of the University of Hawaii system and accredited by the Accrediting Commission for Community and Junior Colleges.

History

Originally located at Pensacola Street and Kapiolani Boulevard (from which the school gets its name), adjacent to President William McKinley High School in the Makiki community, University of Hawaii Kapiolani Community College was established in 1946 as Kapiolani Technical College.

The school was administered by the Territory of Hawaii as one of its chief vocational schools, specializing in food service.  In 1965, its curricula was modified and became an open-door public college administered by the University of Hawaii.  As part of the realignment of programs, the school adopted its current name.

Expansion
Experiencing rapid growth in the 1970s, the Community College needed larger facilities. In 1974, the Board of Regents acquired a 52-acre (210,000 m²) parcel of land on the slopes of Diamond Head in Waikīkī, formerly owned by the United States Army. University of Hawaii Kapiolani Community College opened its second campus at Fort Ruger, the only college in the University of Hawaii system to have two campuses of its own.

The Board of Regents then agreed to move with a complete transfer of programs to the Fort Ruger campus and close the Makiki campus. University of Hawaii Kapiolani Community College finally completed the transfer in the late 1980s.

Points of interest
Campus art includes:
 Spirit Way, bronze sculpture by Sean Kekamakupaʻa Lee Loy Browne, 1987
 Pohaku O Leahi, ceramic sculpture with water feature by Lucille B. Cooper, 1994
 Hawaii, Hawaii, faceted glass mural by Erica Karawina, 1988 
 Mai Ka Mea Hana Ka Ike ("From Tools, Comes Knowledge"), basalt sculpture by Mark Watson, 1988
 Sol III, fiberglass and steel sculpture by Mamoru Sato, 1973

Notable alumni
Jacob Batalon, actor

References

External links
 

Community colleges in Hawaii
University of Hawaiʻi
Education in Honolulu
Educational institutions established in 1946
Schools accredited by the Western Association of Schools and Colleges
1946 establishments in Hawaii